How to Be a Lady: Volume 1 is the debut album of American Electro-R&B group Electrik Red, released May 26, 2009 on Radio Killa and Def Jam Recordings. Production and songwriting for the album was handled primarily by The-Dream and Christopher "Tricky" Stewart. How to Be a Lady is a pop and R&B album that incorporates elements of funk, electropop, dance, crunk&B, soul and hip hop, and contains lyrics concerning sexual and gender-related themes.

The album debuted at number 100 on the U.S. Billboard 200 chart, selling 5,000 copies in its first week. It produced two singles, "Drink in My Cup" and "So Good", that achieved moderate chart success. “P is For Power” was intended as the third single with a music video, but neither was released. Upon its release, How to Be a Lady: Volume 1 received generally positive reviews from most music critics. The album has sold over 5,000 copies in the United States.

Background
While working as back-up dancers for Usher in his 2004 Confessions tour, Kyndra "Binkie" Reevey and Lesley Lewis asked Sarah Rosete if she wanted to be a part of their girl group. Rosete agreed to join, but requested that they meet with her best friend Naomi Allen, who they "fell in love with". The group moved to Los Angeles, where they began working with different producers, including Shannon "Slam" Lawrence and Rodney Jerkins. The group officially formed Electrik Red in 2005. They continued to work as professional dancers, individually appearing in videos for artists such as Mariah Carey, and Janet Jackson. After individually performing as dancers and models, they appeared together in Ciara's video for "Like a Boy". In late 2007, Allen and Rosete were cast in the video for The-Dream's single "Shawty Is a 10" (from his 2007 album Love/Hate).

After Shakir Stewart, then-Executive Vice President of Def Jam Recordings, organized an audition for the group with label chairman L. A. Reid, they were signed to the label on February 23, 2008. Stewart then organized a meeting for the group with The-Dream and Tricky Stewart, who cosigned Electrik Red to their Def Jam-based label, Radio Killa. From then, the pair began producing their music and executive produced their debut album. The group explained they named the album as a "play on the stereotype of what a lady is supposed to be, how she is supposed to act and what she is supposed to say. We're bringing a new age woman to the world". The group wanted to show that it was "okay to be different".

Singles
How to Be a Lady: Volume 1 spawned two official singles, "Drink in My Cup" and "So Good". Music videos were filmed for the singles; "Drink in My Cup" (and one for album track "Friend Lover") were directed by Marc Klasfeld. The group shot a video for the remix of their single "So Good" with rapper Lil Wayne. The album's second and final single, "So Good", has peaked at #60 on the Hot R&B/Hip-Hop Songs.

Commercial performance 
The album debuted at number 100 on the U.S. Billboard 200 chart, with first-week sales of 5,000 copies in the United States. It ultimately spent one week on the chart. It also charted at number 20 on Billboards Top R&B/Hip-Hop Albums chart.

Critical reception 
 
How to Be a Lady: Volume 1 received generally positive reviews from music critics. Several writers drew comparisons to the early work of musician Prince, particularly side-projects such as Apollonia 6 and Vanity 6. Allmusic's Andy Kellman said that the album features "some of the best pop-R&B songs of 2009". Vibe magazine's Tracy Garraud said that it "flows with easy hooks, layered composition, and eccentric idioms particular to the pair—what separates it from previous work is its raciness". Blender called the group "the most musically proficient women to ever inspire drunken bar-top dancing and bad decisions". The Village Voice writer Rob Harvilla highly recommended the album to "Love vs. Money devotees able to suspend both their disbelief and their feminist ardor". Pitchfork Media's Tim Finney praised its songwriting and wrote that the "gratuitous little surprises" in its production make its music "feel as real and lived-in as dazzling, shiny R&B can hope to, possessing a capacity for rightness that cannot be reduced to lyrical sophistication, performative flair, or production novelty, but is borne of the kind of charisma you can possess when you take success for granted". The Huffington Posts Marjon Rebecca Carlos praised the album's sexual and gender themes and its musical execution, stating "Loads of imagery, color, synth-beats and lithe forms come popping forth much to the listener's amusement". The Guardians Alex Macpherson called it "a formed and magnificently executed vision – of love, of sex – set to beats that thrill and seduce in equal measure, and sung with an unabashed confidence", citing it as "one of the most essential R&B albums of the decade".

In a mixed review, Rolling Stone magazines Jon Dolan felt that the songwriting lacked "personality". Jon Pareles, writing in The New York Times, commended The-Dream and Tricky Stewart for their production's "lavished musical ingenuity", but found the album's sexual themes unimaginative.

Track listing

Personnel
Credits for How to Be a Lady: Volume 1 adapted from Allmusic.

 Ashaunna Ayars – marketing  
 Jo Baker – make-up  
 Tom Coyne – mastering  
 Conor Gilligan – assistant  
 Mark Grey – mixing assistant  
 Christy Hall – production assistant  
 Kuk Harrell – engineer, vocal engineer, vocal producer  
 Kendu Isaacs – management  
 Jahaun Johnson – management  
 Sean K. – producer  
 Giancarlo Lino – mixing assistant  

 Scott Naughton – assistant  
 Ciarra Pardo – art direction  
 Dave Pensado – mixing  
 Yves Aimé Pierre – assistant management  
 Kelly "Becky 4 Real" Sheehan – engineer  
 Chris "Tricky" Stewart – producer, executive producer  
 Shakir Stewart – executive producer, A&R  
 Brian "B Luv" Thomas – engineer  
 Pat Thrall – engineer  
 Randy Urbanski – mixing assistant 
 Andrew Wuepper – mixing assistant

Chart history

References

External links
 How to Be a Lady: Volume 1 at Discogs
 Album Review at Concrete Loop

2009 debut albums
Electrik Red albums
Albums produced by The-Dream
Albums produced by Tricky Stewart
Def Jam Recordings albums